Barber Quarters is an unincorporated community in Okeechobee County, Florida, United States. It is a suburb of Okeechobee, located to its north on U.S Route 441.

Geography

References

External links

Unincorporated communities in Okeechobee County, Florida
Unincorporated communities in Florida